Dot Earth is an environmental blog associated to media by science writer Andrew Revkin from 2007 to 2016 for The New York Times. The blog's aim is to examine efforts to balance human affairs with the planet's limits.

Featuring videos, interviews and other types of information like environmental and climate change issues, including energy policy, conservation, biodiversity, and sustainability, Dot Earth was further described as "an interactive exploration of trends and ideas with readers and experts."

History 

Posted on October 25, 2007, Revkin's first entry on Dot Earth was on "Cutting Greenhouse Gases for Cash Prizes". In April 2010, "after 940 posts as a news blog", The New York Times moved Dot Earth to the "Opinion side" of its online site. This move accompanied Revkin's move from a fulltime position to that of a freelancer, with the move being done to make clear the line between the two categories. After nine years and 2,810 posts, Revkin ended the blog on 5 December 2016, just before he began work as a senior reporter for ProPublica.

Readership 

According to a Pace University press release—an institution with which the blog's author is associated, the blog "is ... read by millions of people in more than 200 countries from Brazil to China".

Honors and awards 

 Outside magazine, Top 10 Environmental Blogs (#4), 2011

References

External links 
 Dot Earth official webpage

American environmental websites
The New York Times
Climate change blogs